The Dave Garroway Show is an American old-time radio variety program. It was broadcast on NBC from 1947 to June 17, 1955. The title is a generic name that can refer to programs that had other titles including Reserved for Dave Garroway, Dial Dave Garroway, and Fridays with Dave Garroway.

Format
In a Billboard review of a 1947 episode of The Dave Garroway Show, Cy Wagner wrote, "Here's the show for those who want soothing, relaxing patter, top music and a meaty thought once in a while." He added that the program "accentuates the novel Garroway style and also gives the opportunity for some music arranged to fit the plan for a show that has an overall quiet, almost esoteric tone."

Sponsors included Armour and Company.

The program originated from WMAQ in Chicago, Illinois.

Personnel
In addition to Dave Garroway as host, regulars on the program included Charlie Andrews, June Christie, Jim Fleming, Jack Haskell, Vivian Martin, and Connie Russell. The announcer was Charles Chan. Music was by the Art Van Damme Quintet.

References

External links

Logs
Logs of The Dave Garroway Show from Jerry Haendiges Vintage Radio Logs
Logs of The Dave Garroway Show from radioGOLDINdex

Streaming
Episodes of The Dave Garroway Show from Old Time Radio Researchers Group Library

1947 radio programme debuts
1955 radio programme endings
1940s American radio programs
1950s American radio programs
NBC radio programs